Unlockable content refers to content that is available in video games but not accessible unless something is performed by the player to get access to it. Different genres of games have different styles and options of unlockable content that is standard among their games. The unlockable content varies, and can be as little as a single weapon or enhancement, to more than doubling the playable characters available to the player.

Methods

Presale exclusives
Many games, such as Left 4 Dead 2 and Battlefield: Bad Company 2, offer presales that come with exclusive unlockable content. In order to get these exclusives, one must order the game through the retailer before it is available for sale, with a small deposit to guarantee the game. Once this presale is made, the buyer gets a code to use to get the unlockable content once the game is available. This has been done by many companies worldwide, such as North America's GameStop, UK's Game and many other retailers.

Achievements

Some games have established replayability for players through a rewards system. Once the player does unique or difficult actions in a game, such as killing a boss in a limited time, or collecting a certain number of items over the course of playing the game, or merely progressing through the game in general, the player can earn a reward, potentially unlocking more content, such as additional items for the player to use or vanity items to show the player's prowess at achievements.

The Xbox 360 introduced an achievement framework as a core feature of its system software and online platform Xbox Live; all games released on the console are required to include achievements, which are labeled with a title, description, and icon, and are ranked with point values based on their rarity and degree of difficulty (with retail releases required to have 1,000 points worth of achievements before downloadable content). Achievements and total points earned (Gamerscore) are also tabulated on users' Xbox Live profiles, which created a metagame of players attempting to complete all possible achievements in a game, and trying to increase their cumulative Gamerscore across a variety of Xbox 360 titles. Microsoft subsequently extended Xbox achievements to future Xbox video game consoles (including Xbox One), and Xbox Live-enabled games on Microsoft Windows.

Other video game platforms introduced achievement systems of their own, including the PC digital distribution service Steam, and PlayStation Network "Trophies" on PlayStation 3 in 2008 (which function similarly to Xbox achievements, but are instead ranked as either bronze, silver, or gold, with a "Platinum" trophy awarded for earning all other trophies in a specific game). In 2009, video game publisher Ubisoft introduced an achievement framework specific to its titles as part of its Uplay platform (later renamed Ubisoft Club and Ubisoft Connect), where points earned by completing designated "actions" can be redeemed for rewards and unlocks in other titles published by the company.

In the 2010s, achievement-based unlocks became a prominent aspect of the "battle pass" —a monetization strategy for games where players purchase a collection of challenges intended to be completed within a fixed timeframe, with each completed challenge earning experience points that level up the pass to unlock reward tiers (usually cosmetic items and skins).

Internet usage
Sometimes, the only action necessary to unlock new content is Internet availability. Games like Professor Layton and the Curious Village offered players additional puzzles every week by downloading the puzzles from the Internet over the Nintendo Wi-Fi Connection available in all the Nintendo DS handhelds.

Hidden items
Sometimes a player can unlock content by collecting hidden items found throughout the game. Some games offer a purchase system of additional content, such as images, wallpapers, music and such, great example is the .hack video game series, by collecting the hidden items and redeeming them for the unlockable content. Sometimes the player can get these unlockables based on the total amount of hidden items found.

See also
New Game Plus

References

Video game terminology